James Morton Bishop (January 28, 1898 – September 20, 1973) was a Major League Baseball pitcher. In 22 career games, he had a 0-4 record with a 6.39 ERA. He batted and threw right-handed.

Bishop was born in and died in Montgomery City, Missouri.

External links

1898 births
1973 deaths
Philadelphia Phillies players
Baseball players from Missouri
People from Montgomery City, Missouri